Charles Wang (born 1944) is a businessman and philanthropist.

Charles Wang may also refer to:
Charles Wang (golfer) (born 1997), Chinese professional golfer
Charles Wang (physician), Chinese physician and lawyer